Gertrud Schäfer (born 26 October 1944) is a German athlete. She competed in the women's shot put at the 1968 Summer Olympics.

References

External links
 

1944 births
Living people
Athletes (track and field) at the 1968 Summer Olympics
German female shot putters
Olympic athletes of West Germany
Place of birth missing (living people)
20th-century German women
21st-century German women